The Chicago Declaration of Evangelical Social Concern is a document drafted in 1973 by several evangelical faith leaders, and signed by 53 signatories. Concerned with what they saw as a diversion between Christian faith and a commitment to social justice, the Chicago Declaration was written as a call to reject racism, economic materialism, economic inequality, militarism, and sexism. Under the leadership of Ron Sider, The Chicago Declaration became the founding document for Evangelicals for Social Action, a think-tank which seeks to develop biblical  solutions to social and economic problems through incubating programs that operate at the intersection of faith and social justice.

Description 

At the first Calvin College conference on politics that Paul B. Henry organized in the spring of 1973, several organizers, including David Moberg, Rufus Jones, and Paul Henry, decided to call a weekend workshop over Thanksgiving, 1973. The committee invited a broad range of evangelical leaders to come and talk about the need for strengthening evangelical social concern. Nearly forty individuals attended: older evangelicals like Carl F. H. Henry, Frank Gaebelein; younger evangelicals like Jim Wallis, John Perkins, Sharon Gallagher, Rich Mouw, and Ron Sider. Perhaps fittingly, they held their meeting at the YMCA on Wabash Avenue in Chicago.

The assembled individuals wrote and signed The Chicago Declaration of Evangelical Social Concern, confessing the failure of evangelical Christianity to confront injustice, racism, and discrimination against women, and pledging to do better.

The Chicago Declaration of Evangelical Social Concern became the founding document for Evangelicals for Social Action, which was founded in 1974.

Dick Ostling of Time magazine wrote that it was probably the first time in the 20th century that forty evangelical leaders spent a whole weekend discussing social action. Writing for the Chicago Sun Times, Roy Larson declared that someday, church historians would write that “the most significant church-related event of 1973" at this gathering.

As Christianity Today magazine noted on the 30th anniversary of the declaration, the conference's stated purpose wouldn't register as surprising today, when evangelicals from all different political stripes agree that at least some form of social justice is a central tenant of the Christian faith. But "...Thirty years ago, only a frustrated minority—like those at the Chicago meeting—thought so...Three decades ago, a lot of evangelicals would have called this political meddling, if not selling out the gospel."

Signatories 

 John F. Alexander
 Joseph Bayly
 Ruth L. Bentley
 William Bentley
 Dale Brown
 James C. Cross
 Donald Dayton
 Roger Dewey
 James Dunn
 Daniel Ebersole
 Samuel Escobar
 Warren C. Falcon
 Frank Gaebelein
 Sharon Gallagher
 Theodore E. Gannon
 Art Gish
 Vernon Grounds
 Nancy Hardesty
 Carl F. H. Henry
 Paul B. Henry
 Clarence Hilliard
 Walden Howard
 Rufus Jones
 Robert Tad Lehe
 William Leslie
 C. T. McIntire
 Wes Michaelson
 David O. Moberg
 Stephen Mott
 Richard Mouw
 David Nelson
 F. Burton Nelson
 William Pannell
 John M. Perkins
 William Petersen
 Richard Pierard
 Wyn Wright Potter
 Ron Potter
 Bernard Ramm
 Paul Rees
 Boyd Reese
 Joe Roos
 James Robert Ross
 Eunice Schatz
 Ronald J. Sider
 Donna Simmons
 Lewis Smedes
 Foy Valentine
 Marlin Van Elderen
 Jim Wallis
 Robert E. Webber
 Merold Westphal
 John Howard Yoder

References

External links 

 Full text from the Center for Public Justice
 Full text from The Project on Lived Theology at the University of Virginia

1973 documents
Anti-racism in the United States
Christianity and society in the United States
Economy and Christianity
Evangelical Christian conferences
Gender and Christianity
Gender roles
Christianity and race
Religious proclamations
Social justice